Don Ray may refer to:

 Raymond Donnez or Don Ray (1942–2019), disco producer, arranger and performer
 Don Ray (basketball) (1921–1998), basketball player
 Don B. Ray (1925–2005), American television composer